Atticus is a murder-mystery novel written by Ron Hansen in 1996. The main character, Atticus Cody, is similar to Atticus Finch of To Kill a Mockingbird.

In 1996 it was a finalist for the National Book Award for Fiction, and in 1997 for the PEN/Faulkner Award for Fiction. In 2000 it was adapted into the film Missing Pieces starring James Coburn.

References

1996 American novels
American mystery novels
American novels adapted into films
HarperCollins books